Francisco Arce Armenta (born August 29, 1981) is a Mexican professional boxer. He is a former IBF Latino Super Flyweight champion and was NABF Super Bantamweight champion. Francisco is also the younger brother of former five-division world champion Jorge Arce.

Professional career
Early in his career he lost to future world champion Giovanni Segura in Maywood, California.

In November 2008, Francisco won the IBF Latino super flyweight champion by beating William De Sousa of Panama.

On October 9, 2010 Arce beat former WBO champion Isidro García to win the NABF super bantamweight championship.

Retirement
He retired in 2010. He is a father of three girls (Emily, America, Nalani) and has been married 20 years to America Armenta.

Professional boxing record

See also
Notable boxing families

References

External links
 

Boxers from Sinaloa
Sportspeople from Los Mochis
Super-bantamweight boxers
Super-flyweight boxers
1981 births
Living people
Mexican male boxers